Giorgi Chkhaidze (born 20 August 1981 in Tbilisi) is a Georgian rugby union player who plays as a flanker.

He moved to France, where he has played for six clubs—Massy (2006–07), Racing 92 (at the time Racing Métro 92; 2007–2009), where he won the Pro D2 in 2008–09; Montpellier (2009–2011); Saint-Junien (2011–12); Tarbes (2012–14); and currently with Fédérale 1 side Lille (2014–present).

He has 101 caps for Georgia, since his debut, an 88-0 win over Netherlands, in Tbilisi, at 3 February 2002, aged only 19 years old, for the Six Nations B. He counts 4 tries scored, 20 points in aggregate. He was called for the 2003 Rugby World Cup, playing in three matches, the 2007 Rugby World Cup, playing in four matches, and the 2011 Rugby World Cup, once again in four matches. Chkhaidze appeared in his fourth World Cup in 2015.

External links

1981 births
Living people
Rugby union players from Georgia (country)
Rugby union flankers
Expatriate rugby union players from Georgia (country)
Expatriate rugby union players in France
Expatriate sportspeople from Georgia (country) in France
Montpellier Hérault Rugby players
Racing 92 players
Georgia international rugby union players